

Events

January–March 
 January 1
 The French Republican Calendar is abolished.
 The Kingdom of Bavaria is established by Napoleon.
 January 5 – The body of Horatio Nelson, 1st Viscount Nelson, lies in state in the Painted Hall of Greenwich Hospital, London, prior to his funeral.
 January 8 – Battle of Blaauwberg: British infantry force troops of the Batavian Republic in the Dutch Cape Colony to withdraw.
 January 9
 The Dutch commandant of Cape Town surrenders to British forces. On January 10, formal capitulation is signed under the Treaty Tree in  Papendorp (modern-day Woodstock).
 Lord Nelson is given a state funeral and internment at St Paul's Cathedral in London, attended by the Prince of Wales.
 January 18 – The Dutch Cape Colony capitulates to British forces, the origin of its status as a colony within the British Empire.
 January 23
 Grenville succeeds his cousin William Pitt the Younger as wartime Prime Minister of the United Kingdom upon Pitt's death this day amidst worsening health, caused by the stresses of the Napoleonic Wars.
 Invasion of Naples: Ferdinand I of the Two Sicilies flees to the Kingdom of Sicily under British protection.
 February 6 – Battle of San Domingo: The British Royal Navy gains a victory over the French off Santo Domingo.
 February 15 – Invasion of Naples: Joseph Bonaparte enters Naples.
 March 23 – Explorers Lewis and Clark and their Corps of Discovery, having reached the Pacific Ocean after traveling through the Louisiana Purchase, begin their journey home.
 March 28 – Washington College (modern-day Washington & Jefferson College) is chartered by the Pennsylvania General Assembly.
 March 29 – Construction is authorized of the National Road, the first United States federal highway.
 March 30 – Kingdom of Naples (Napoleonic) proclaimed.

April–June 
 April 8 – Stéphanie de Beauharnais, adopted daughter of Napoleon Bonaparte, marries Prince Karl Ludwig Friedrich of Baden.
 April 25 – Rana Bahadur Shah is killed by his step-brother Sher Bahadur Shah in the late night meeting which triggers two weeks' long massacre in Bhandarkhal garden.
 May 30 – Future President of the United States Andrew Jackson fights his second duel, killing a man who had accused Jackson's wife of bigamy.
 June 5 – Louis Bonaparte is appointed as King of Holland by his brother, Emperor Napoleon, replacing the Batavian Republic.

July–September 
 July 4
 Battle of Maida: Britain defeats the French in Calabria.
 The legendary ship The Irish Rover sets sail from the Cove of Cork, Ireland for New York.
 July 10 – Vellore Mutiny: Indian sepoys mutiny against the East India Company, for the first time.
 July 12 – Sixteen German Imperial States leave the Holy Roman Empire and form the Confederation of the Rhine, leading to the collapse of the Empire after 844 years. Liechtenstein is given full sovereignty.
 July 15 – Pike Expedition: Near St. Louis, Missouri, United States Army Lieutenant Zebulon Pike leads an expedition from Fort Bellefontaine, to explore the American West.
 July 18 – 1806 Birgu polverista explosion: A gunpowder magazine explosion in Birgu, Malta kills around 200 people.
 July 23 – British invasions of the River Plate: A British expeditionary force of 1,700 men lands on the left bank of the Río de la Plata and invades Buenos Aires.
 August 6 – Francis II, the last Holy Roman Emperor, abdicates, thus ending the Holy Roman Empire after about a millennium. 
 August 18 – English seal hunter Abraham Bristow discovers the Auckland Islands.
 September 23 – The Lewis and Clark Expedition reaches St. Louis, Missouri, ending a successful exploration of the Louisiana Territory and the Pacific Northwest. According to one historian, their arrival comes "much to the amazement of residents, who had given the travelers up for dead."
 September 25 – Prussia issues an ultimatum to Paris, threatening war if France does not halt marching its troops through Prussian territory to reach Austria; the message does not reach Napoleon Bonaparte until October 7, and he responds by attacking Prussia.

October–December 
 October 8 – Napoleon responds to the September 25 ultimatum from Prussia, and begins the War of the Fourth Coalition; Prussia is joined by Saxony and other minor German states.
 October 9 – Battle of Schleiz: French and Prussian forces fight for the first time since the war began. The Prussian army is easily defeated by a more numerous French force.  
 October 14 – Battle of Jena–Auerstedt: Napoleon defeats the Prussian army of Prince Hohenlohe at Jena, while Marshal Davout defeats the main Prussian army under Charles William Ferdinand, Duke of Brunswick-Wolfenbüttel, who is killed.
 October 17 – Emperor Jacques I of Haiti (Jean-Jacques Dessalines) is assassinated at the Pont-Rouge, Haiti, and Alexandre Pétion becomes first President of the Republic of Haiti.
 October 24 – French forces enter Berlin.
 October 20 – British ship of the line  is wrecked in the Strait of Sicily with the loss of 347 of the 488 on board.
 October 30 –  Capitulation of Stettin: Believing themselves massively outnumbered, the 5,300-man garrison at Stettin in Prussia surrenders to a much smaller French force without a fight.
 November 15 – Pike Expedition: During his second exploratory expedition, Lieutenant Zebulon Pike sees a distant mountain peak while near the Colorado foothills of the Rocky Mountains (later named Pikes Peak in his honor).
 November 21 – Napoleon declares the Continental Blockade against the British, blocking the import of British manufactured goods to the rest of Europe.
 November 24 – The last major Prussian field force, under Gebhard Leberecht von Blücher, surrenders to the French near Lübeck. Frederick William III has by this time fled to Russia.
 November 28 – French troops enter Warsaw.
 December 23 - Ludwig van Beethoven premieres his violin concerto at the Theater an der Wien.
 December 26 – War of the Fourth Coalition:
 Battle of Pułtusk – Russian forces under General Bennigsen narrowly escape from a direct confrontation with Napoleon, who goes into winter quarters.
 Battle of Golymin – Russian forces under General Golitsyn fight a successful rearguard action against French forces, under Marshall Murat.

Date unknown 
 East India Company College established in Hertfordshire, England, to train colonial administrators.
 Noah Webster publishes his first dictionary, A Compendious Dictionary of the English Language, recording distinctive American spellings.
 Colgate-Palmolive is originated as William Colgate's soap and candle manufactory in New York City, United States.
 Annual British iron production reaches 260,000 tons.

Births

January–June 

 January 1 – Lionel Kieseritzky, Baltic-German chess player (d. 1853)
 January 27 – Juan Crisóstomo Arriaga, Spanish composer (d. 1826)
 February 10 – Emma Catherine Embury, American author and poet (d. 1863)
 February 22 – Józef Kremer, Polish messianic philosopher (d. 1875)
 March 4
 Ephraim Wales Bull, American farmer, creator of the Concord grape (d. 1895)
 George Bradburn, American abolitionist, women's rights advocate (d. 1880)
 March 6 – Elizabeth Barrett Browning, English poet (d. 1861)
 March 11 – Carlo Pellion di Persano, Italian admiral, politician (d. 1883)
 March 12 – Jane Pierce, First Lady of the United States (d. 1863)
 March 21 – Benito Juárez, Mexican statesman, folk hero (d. 1872)
 April 3 – Ivan Kireyevsky, Russian literary critic, philosopher (d. 1856)
 April 6 – Friedrich Wilhelm Ritschl, German scholar (d. 1876)
 April 9 – Isambard Kingdom Brunel, British engineer (d. 1859)
 May 2 – Catherine Labouré, French visionary, saint (d. 1876)
 May 4 – William Fothergill Cooke, English inventor (d. 1879)
 May 12 – J. V. Snellman, Finnish statesman and an influential Fennoman philosopher (d. 1881)
 May 20 – John Stuart Mill, British philosopher (d. 1873)
 June 12 – John Augustus Roebling, German-American engineer (d. 1869)
 June 27 – Augustus De Morgan, British mathematician, logician (d. 1871)

July–December 

 July 5
 James Dawson, Scottish-born Australian settler, champion of aboriginal interests (d. 1900)
 Blanka Teleki, Hungarian countess, women's rights activist  (d. 1862)
 September 12 – Andrew Hull Foote, American admiral (d. 1863)
 September 22 – Bernardino António Gomes, Portuguese physician and naturalist (d. 1877)
 October 3 – Oliver Cowdery, American religious leader (d. 1850)
 October 25 – Max Stirner, German philosopher (d. 1856)
 November 10 – Sir Alexander Milne, British admiral (d. 1896)
 November 13 – Emilia Plater, Polish heroine (d. 1831)
 November 16 – Mary Tyler Peabody Mann, American education reformer and author (d. 1887)
 December 11 – Otto Wilhelm Hermann von Abich, German geologist (d. 1886)

Date unknown 
 Edward Welch, Welsh architect (d. 1868)
 Silas Gill, Methodist preacher (d. 1875)
 Anne Clarke, Australian theater manager
 Black Beaver, Indigenous American (Lenape) trapper, interpreter, scout, and guide (d. 1880)

Deaths

January–June 

 January 8 – Magdalena Dávalos y Maldonado, Ecuadorian scholar, socialite (b. 1725)
 January 23 – William Pitt the Younger, Prime Minister of the United Kingdom (b. 1759)
 February 2 – Rétif de la Bretonne, French writer (b. 1734)
 February 16 – Franz von Weyrother, Austrian general (b. 1755)
 February 19 – Elizabeth Carter, English writer (b. 1717)
 February 20 – Lachlan McIntosh, Scottish-born American military and political leader (b. 1725)
 March 20 – Salomea Deszner, Polish actress, singer and theater director (b. 1759)
 March 23 – George Pinto, English composer (b. 1785)
 March 30 – Georgiana Cavendish, Duchess of Devonshire, English noblewoman, socialite, political organizer, style icon, author and activist (b. 1757)
 April 9 – William V, Prince of Orange, last Stadtholder of the Dutch Republic (b. 1748)
 April 10 – Horatio Gates, British soldier, served as an American general during the American Revolutionary War (b. 1727)
 April 22 – Pierre-Charles Villeneuve, French admiral (stabbed) (b. 1763)
 May 9 – Robert Morris, English-born merchant, one of the Founding Fathers of the United States, "financier of the American Revolution" (b. 1734)
 May 24 – John Campbell, 5th Duke of Argyll, British field marshal (b. 1723)
 June 23 – Mathurin Jacques Brisson, French naturalist (b. 1723)
 June 30 – Charles Dickinson, American attorney, famous duelist (killed in a duel by Andrew Jackson) (b. 1780)

July–December 

 July 4 – Charles Henri Sanson, Royal Executioner of France during the reign of King Louis XVI (b. 1739)
 July 10 – George Stubbs, English painter (b. 1724)
 July 11 – James Smith, American signer of the United States Declaration of Independence
 July 17 – Sir Richard Sullivan, 1st Baronet, British politician (b. 1752)
 August 10 – Michael Haydn, Austrian composer (b. 1737)
 August 22 – Jean-Honoré Fragonard, French painter (b. 1742)
 August 23 – Charles-Augustin de Coulomb, French physicist (b. 1736)
 September 9 – William Paterson, signer of the United States Constitution, Governor of New Jersey (b. 1745)
 September 13 – Charles James Fox, English politician (b. 1749)
 September 30 – William Fortescue, 1st Earl of Clermont, Irish politician (b. 1722)
 October 9 – Benjamin Banneker, American astronomer, surveyor (b. 1731)
 October 10 – Louis Ferdinand of Prussia, German prince (killed in battle) (b. 1772)
 October 23 – Timothy Dexter, American businessman (b. 1748)
 October 25 – Henry Knox, Secretary of War under George Washington (b. 1750)
 October 26 – John Graves Simcoe, first Lieutenant-Governor of Upper Canada (b. 1752)
 November 10 – Karl Wilhelm Ferdinand, Duke of Brunswick (b. 1735)
 November 23 – Roger Newdigate, British politician (b. 1719)
 December 9 – Josef Georg Hörl, Austrian politician (b. 1722)
 December 22 – William Vernon, American merchant (b. 1719)
 December 26 – Louis Carrogis Carmontelle, French dramatist (b. 1717)

Date unknown 
 Mungo Park, Scottish explorer (b. 1771)
 Johann Gottfried Arnold, German cellist (b. 1773)

References